The St Michael's Anglican Church is a church in the Sydney suburb of Surry Hills. It is located on the corner of Albion and Flinders Street and together with the adjoining rectory and parish hall it is listed on the Register of the National Estate. In 2015 the church merged with Vine Church, which was an Anglican church plant that had started in Surry Hills in 2011. In 2017, the church changed its name to Vine Church to reflect the renewal the church has undergone and the life, love and freedom which are on offer to those who connect to Jesus.

History and description 

St Michael's Anglican Church was designed by Edmund Blacket in 1854 in the Gothic Revival style. Built of sandstone with a slate roof, it features a belfry, dormers (added in 1888), a fine interior of nave with side aisles, painted ceiling, and dormer lights. The chancel was rebuilt, and vestries added in 1917 by John Burcham Clamp.

The rectory, located next to the church, was also designed by John Burcham Clamp in the Edwardian style and was built in 1917. It is a two storey face brick building with slate roof, and a balustrade with wood shingles. The adjoining St Michael's parish hall is a two storey stuccoed brick with tiled roof building in an ecclesiastical Gothic style.

In 2018, the Parish Council engaged Neeson Murcutt architects to design alterations and additions to the existing buildings on the site to meet the contemporary functional requirements of the church. Work commenced in January 2021 and is expected to be completed by the end of 2021.

See also

 List of Anglican churches in the Diocese of Sydney

References

Further reading

Vine Church Website 

19th-century Anglican church buildings
Anglican church buildings in Sydney
Gothic Revival architecture in Sydney
Gothic Revival church buildings in Australia
New South Wales places listed on the defunct Register of the National Estate
Edmund Blacket buildings in Sydney
Edmund Blacket church buildings
Anglican Diocese of Sydney